Charles Pitt was an English medical doctor who went missing in Ticonderoga during the French and Indian War and probably at the Battle of Carillon in 1758.  He was originally from Tewkesbury, England.

According to a letter written by a descendant (Mrs Miller) in the nineteenth century: "Dr Pitt was sent out as surgeon to the then wilderness of British Colonies, at that period, there was constant warfare going on between the French and English, each had Indian allies, the difficulties getting from place to place was impressed upon my childish mind when we lived in Quebec and travelled to New York; the places seemed very remote from civilisation.  We could only wonder how and why the British Army ever penetrated such vasts forest and why they could not let the French enjoy their possessions and they (the British) stay at home.  However considering the conditions, the Indians who carried the savage warfare, the trackless forests, the big lakes, the mountains, the possibilities of death from starvation, or worse as a captive to Indians, one can easily understand why after the battle Dr Pitt was reported missing; then the Chancery Court took charge of his estate and refused to give anything unless the heirs could bring proof of his death, which of course could not be done".

A second undated account states that he was "appointed a medical (sic) to the army in America before the revolutionary war.  After the war broke out he was never heard of by his relations in England.  He left at Tewkesbury his daughter Betty Pitt and a niece Mary Hepworth who married William Dillon".  He is also described in a further letter written in about 1900 as a "surgeon .... in the British Army" and "lost his life in Ticonderoga, America".

A "small oval portrait" of Dr Charles Pitt once hung in the Swan Hotel, Tewkesbury.

Year of birth missing
Year of death missing
British Army regimental surgeons
People from Tewkesbury
Military personnel killed in the French and Indian War